Cooper Township may refer to the following places in the United States:

 Cooper Township, Sangamon County, Illinois
 Cooper Township, Webster County, Iowa
 Cooper Township, Michigan
 Cooper Township, Gentry County, Missouri
 Cooper Township, Clearfield County, Pennsylvania
 Cooper Township, Montour County, Pennsylvania

Township name disambiguation pages